Aisam-ul-Haq Qureshi and Martin Slanar were the defending champions, but they didn't participate this year.

Seeds

Draw

Draw

External links
 Doubles Draw
 Qualifying Draw

Shimadzu All Japan Indoor Tennis Championships - Doubles
2010 Doubles